Purbachal Expressway is a , eight-lane-wide avenue expressway in Dhaka, Bangladesh. This expressway connects Purbachal to eastern Dhaka.

History
In 2005, a proposal involving development for project of Purbachal was passed. In that proposal an eight-lane expressway was mentioned. But RAJUK started the expressway project with a four-lane road in 2013 because of fund shortage. RAJUK built the link road with Tk 300 crore. In 2015 Detailed Area Plan passed by ECNEC. In the new plan a road with 100-foot canal on the both side of road was added. For this road project a budget of Tk 5,287 crore was mentioned. After completing the existing project, To expanding the road into 8-lane expressway, government had to reshaped the project in November 2018. The budget for the project was revised to Tk 10,330 crore. For the revision and canal the 300 feet road will be built as 235 feet. It has been decided to reconstruct the expressway by Bangladesh Army instead of RAJUK.

Specifications
Under the project, canals, walkways, Iulups, multiple bridges for crossing the canal, multiple foot overbridges for expressway crossing, sluice gates, water bus stops and sewer lines are being constructed for the expressway.

Connectivity
An expressway under construction named Dhaka Bypass Expressway will connect Gazipur and Narayanganj district through Purbachal Expressway. Seven stations of MRT Line 1 will be built on the expressway.

References

Purbachal
Roads in Dhaka
Expressways in Bangladesh